Paul Langton Grano (22 October 1894 – 11 January 1975) was an Australian poet and journalist.

Biography 

Born in Ararat, Victoria, Grano studied Law at the University of Melbourne. He worked as a journalist and commercial traveller, and in 1932 moved to Queensland where he worked in the Main Roads Commission. In 1933, he founded the Catholic Poetry Society in Brisbane, and in 1934 the Catholic Readers' and Writers' Society.

Works 

 Quest, Melbourne: The Hawthorn Press, 1940 
 Poet's Holiday, Brisbane : Yallaroi Publication, 1941 
 Poems Old & New, Melbourne: Georgian House, 1945 
 Witness to the Stars: an Anthology of Australasian Verse by Catholic Poets, edited by Paul Grano; with foreword by George O'Neill, Sydney: Angus and Robertson, 1946 
 Selected Verse of Paul Grano (1894–1975), Melbourne: Hawthorn Press, 1976

References 

1894 births
1975 deaths
Writers from Victoria (Australia)
20th-century Australian poets
Australian male poets
20th-century Australian male writers
20th-century Australian journalists